Mike Clark also known as Movie Mike (1947 – July 31, 2020; Reston, Virginia) was an American film critic for USA Today from 1985 until 2009, and a member of the National Society of Film Critics.

Death 
On July 31, 2020, Clark died at age of 73 at a hospital in Reston, Virginia while having a head injury which led to bleeding around the brain after a fall on July 27, and after battling liver disease for years.

References 

1947 births
2020 deaths
American film critics